Tripolium is a genus of Eurasian and North African plants in the tribe Astereae within the family Asteraceae.

Species
 a) species accepted
 Tripolium pannonicum (Jacq.) Dobrocz. - widespread from Ireland + Algeria to Japan
 Tripolium sorrentinoi (Tod.) Raimondo & Greuter - Sicily

 b) species formerly included
once regarded as belonging to Tripolium but now considered better suited to other genera: 

 c) species listed as being of unresolved status

References

Astereae
Flora of Europe
Flora of North Africa
Flora of temperate Asia
Asteraceae genera
Taxa named by Christian Gottfried Daniel Nees von Esenbeck